A public offering without listing, often called a POWL deal or a POWL, is a form of public equity offering by non-Japanese firms in the Japanese market, without the previously required simultaneous listing on a local exchange (e.g. TSE).

History 

Prior to 1989, non-Japanese firms that wanted to sell equity into the Japanese market via public offering were required to list on a local Japanese stock exchange. Changes in regulations introduced in 1989 allowed this form of a public offering by foreign companies published, audited financial statements and with stock that is (or will be) listed on a foreign stock exchange which satisfies the requirements of the FSA.

Notable POWL issuance 

Equity offerings via POWL have been a common part of Asia regional public offerings since the early 1990s, with Japanese investors often taking more than 20% of the offering through this format. ICBC and Bank of China (Hong Kong) used this format to allow their domestic public offerings to spread into Japan.

See also 
Alternative public offering
PIPE deal

References 

Corporate finance
Stock market
Equity securities
Initial public offering